Junction Railroad may refer to:

Junction Railroad (Buffalo, NY), part of The New York Central Railroad
Junction Railroad (Ohio), part of the Lake Shore and Michigan Southern Railway
Junction Railroad (Philadelphia), part of the Pennsylvania Railroad system